Idiopyrgus is a genus of freshwater snails with gills and an operculum, aquatic gastropod mollusks in the family Tomichiidae .

Distribution 
The distribution of the genus Idiopyrgus includes Brazil.

Species
Species within the genus Idiopyrgus include:
 Idiopyrgus adamanteus Salvador, Silva & Bichuette, 2022
 Idiopyrgus brasiliensis (Rey, 1959)
 Idiopyrgus minor Salvador, Silva & Bichuette, 2022
 Idiopyrgus pilbryi F. Baker, 1913
 Idiopyrgus rudolphi (F. Haas, 1938)
 Idiopyrgus souleyetianus Pilsbry, 1911 - type species
 Idiopyrgus walkeri Pilsbry, 1924

Malek (1983) noted that Idiopyrgus pilbryi and Idiopyrgus walkeri were described from shells only, but should stay valid until the anatomy of the soft parts is also elucidated.

References
This article incorporates public domain text from the reference

External links
 Haas, F. (1938). Neue Binnen Mollusken aus Nordost Brasilien. Archiv für Molluskenkunde. 70: 46-51
  Salvador, R. B.; Silva, F. S.; Bichuette, M. E. (2022). Phylogenetic position of the relict South American genus Idiopyrgus Pilsbry, 1911 (Gastropoda, Truncatelloidea), with the description of two new cave species. Zoosystematics and Evolution. 98(2): 365-375

Truncatelloidea